Charles Tomlinson Griffes (September 17, 1884 – April 8, 1920) was an American composer for piano, chamber ensembles and voice. His initial works are influenced by German Romanticism, but after he relinquished the German style, his later works make him the most famous American representative of musical Impressionism, along with Charles Martin Loeffler. He was fascinated by the exotic, mysterious sound of the French Impressionists, and was compositionally much influenced by them while he was in Europe. He also studied the work of contemporary Russian composers such as Scriabin, whose influence is also apparent in his use of synthetic scales.

Musical career
Griffes was born in Elmira, New York. He had early piano lessons with his sister Katherine and later studied piano with Mary Selena Broughton, who taught at Elmira College. Broughton had a profound impact on his personal and musical development. After early studies on piano and organ in his home town, on recommendation of Broughton, he went to Berlin to study with pianist Ernst Jedliczka and Gottfried Galston at the Stern Conservatory. Although recognised as a performer, Griffes grew more interested in composition. Despite being advised against it by Broughton, he left the conservatory and was briefly taught by composer Engelbert Humperdinck. During his time in Berlin he composed several German songs and the Symphonische Phantasie for orchestra.

On returning to the U.S. in 1907, he became director of music studies at the Hackley School for boys in Tarrytown, New York, a post which he held until his early death thirteen years later. His post has been described as "grim and unrewarding", though it gave him financial stability. He continued to compose at Hackley in his free time and promoted his music during the summer.

His most famous works are the White Peacock, for piano (1915, orchestrated in 1919); his Piano Sonata (1917–18, revised 1919); a tone poem, The Pleasure Dome of Kubla Khan, after the fragment by Coleridge (1912, revised in 1916), and Poem for Flute and Orchestra (1918). He also wrote numerous programmatic pieces for piano, chamber ensembles, and for voice. The amount and quality of his music is impressive considering his short life and his full-time teaching job, and much of his music is still performed. His unpublished Sho-jo (1917), a one-act pantomimic drama based on Japanese themes, is one of the earliest works by an American composer to show direct inspiration from the music of Japan.

Personal life

Griffes died of influenza in New York City during the worldwide Spanish Flu pandemic at the age of 35 and is buried in Bloomfield Cemetery in Bloomfield, New Jersey. His papers passed to his younger sister Marguerite, who chose to destroy many that explicitly related to his life as a homosexual. Donna Anderson (see below) is his current literary executor.
Griffes kept meticulous diaries, some in German, which chronicled his musical accomplishments from 1907 to 1919, and also dealt honestly with his homosexuality, including his regular patronage of the bathhouses at Lafayette Place and the Produce Exchange.

During his time as a student in Berlin he was devoted to his "special friend" Emil Joèl (aka "Konrad Wölcke"). In later life, he had a long term relationship with John Meyer (biographer Edward Maisel used the pseudonym Dan C. Martin), a married New York policeman.

Musical compositions

Stage works
The Kairn of Koridwen (dance drama in two scenes, after E. Schuré), fl, 2 cl, 2 hn, hp, cel, pf, 1916, New York, February 10, 1917; arr. pf, 1916
Sho-jo (Japanese pantomime in one scene), fl, ob, cl, hp, Chin. drum, tam-tam, timp, 4 str, 1917, rev. ?1919, Atlantic City, NJ, August 5, 1917
Sakura-sakura (Japanese folkdance arrangement), fl, cl, hp, 2 vn, vc, db, ?1917, Atlantic City, NJ, August 5, 1917
The White Peacock (solo ballet, arrangement of piano work), orchestra, ?1919, New York, June 22, 1919
Salut au monde (festival drama in three acts, after Walt Whitman), fl, cl, 2 hn, tpt, 2 trombones, timp, drums, 2 hp, pf, 1919, incomplete, New York, April 22, 1922

Orchestral works
Overture, c1905
Symphonische Phantasie, 1907, arranged for 2 pianos, ?1910
The Pleasure-Dome of Kubla Khan, Op. 8, 1917, Boston Symphony Orch., cond. P. Monteux, Boston, November 28, 1919 [version of piano piece, 1912]
Notturno für Orchester, ?1918, Philadelphia Orch,. cond. L. Stokowski, Philadelphia, December 19, 1919; arr. piano and string orch.
Poem, flute and orchestra, 1918, G. Barrère, New York Symphony Orch., cond. W. Damrosch, November 16, 1919
Bacchanale, ?1919, Philadelphia Orch., cond. Stokowski, Philadelphia, December 19, 1919 [version of Scherzo for piano, 1913]
Clouds, ?1919, Philadelphia Orch., cond. Stokowski, Philadelphia, December 19, 1919 [version of piano piece, 1916]
The White Peacock, ?1919, Philadelphia Orch., cond. Stokowski, Philadelphia, December 19, 1919 [version of piano piece, 1915]
Nocturne, 1919 [version of 2nd movement of Piano Sonata, 1917–18]
Notturno, strings [version of orchestral piece, ?1918]

Chamber music
Three Tone-Pictures, woodwinds and harp, 1915, nos. 1–2 Barrère Ensemble, New York, December 19, 1916; arr. wind quintet, str qnt, pf, ?1919, New York Chamber Music Society, Greenwich, CT, June 4, 1920 [versions of piano pieces, 1910–12]
The Lake at Evening
The Vale of Dreams
The Night Winds
Komori uta, Noge no yama, fl, ob, cl, hp, 2 vn, vc, db, ?Chin. drum, ?1917 [Japanese melodies]
Two Sketches based on Indian Themes: Lento e mesto, Allegro giocoso, str quartet, 1918–19; ?première, Flonzaley Quartet, New York, November 24, 1920

Piano
Six Variations, Op. 2, 1898
Four Preludes, Op. 4, 1899–1900
Three Tone-Pictures, Op. 5: The Lake at Evening, 1910, L. Hodgson, New York, April 3, 1914; The Vale of Dreams, 1912; The Night Winds, 1911; arr. ens, 1915, arr. orch. 1919
Fantasy Pieces, Op. 6: Barcarolle, 1912, Griffes, Lowell, MA, November 3, 1914; Notturno, 1915; Scherzo, 1913, orchestrated as Bacchanale, ?1919
Roman Sketches, Op. 7: The White Peacock, 1915, W. Christie, New York, February 23, 1916, orchestrated ?1919; Nightfall, 1916; The Fountain of the Acqua Paola, 1916; Clouds, 1916, orchestrated ?1919
Children's pieces, first published under name of Arthur Tomlinson: 6 Short Pieces, 1918; 6 Patriotic Songs, 1918; 6 Bugle-Call Pieces, 1918; 6 Familiar Songs (1919); 6 Pieces for Treble Clef (1919)
Mazurka, 1898–1900
Sonata, f, ?1904, Griffes, Berlin, June 22, 1905
Sonata, D, 1 movement, ?1910
Symphonische Phantasie, 2 pf, ?1910 [version of orchestra piece, 1907]
Sonata, D, 2 movements, ?1911
The Pleasure-Dome of Kubla Khan, 1912, rev. 1915, orchestrated 1917
Sonata, f, ?1912
Rhapsody, b, 1914
Piece, B, ?1915
De profundis, 1915
Legend, 1915
Piece, d, 1915
Winter Landscape, c1912
Piece, E, 1916
Dance, a, ?1916
Sonata, 1917–18, Griffes, New York, February 26, 1918, 2nd movement orchestrated as Nocturne, 1919
Three Preludes, 1919
Notturno [arr. of orchestral piece, ?1918]
Arrangement of J. Offenbach: Barcarolle, Belle nuit, o nuit d'amour, piano solo, perf. 1910
Arrangement of E. Humperdinck: Hänsel und Gretel, overture, 2 pianos, 1910

Organ
Chorale on ""Allein Gott in der Höh sei Ehr", 1910

Songs
Tone-Images, Op. 3
La fuite de la lune (Oscar Wilde), 1912
Symphony in Yellow (Wilde), 1912
We'll to the Woods, and Gather May (W. E. Henley), 1914
Two Rondels, Op. 4, c1914
This Book of Hours (W. Crane)
Come, Love, across the Sunlit Land (C. Scollard)
Four Impressions (Wilde)
Le jardin, 1915
Impression du matin, 1915
La mer, 1912, new setting 1916
Le réveillon, 1914
Three Poems, Op. 9, 1916
In a Myrtle Shade (William Blake)
Waikiki (R. Brooke), E. Gauthier, M. Hansotte, New York, April 22, 1918
Phantoms (A. Giovannitti)
Five Poems of Ancient China and Japan, Op. 10; E. Gauthier, Griffes, New York, November 1, 1917
So-fei Gathering Flowers (Wang Chang-Ling), 1917
Landscape (Sada-ihe), 1916
The Old Temple among the Mountains (Chang Wen-Chang), 1916
Tears (Wang Seng-Ju), 1916
A Feast of Lanterns (Yuan Mei), 1917
Two Poems (J. Masefield); E. Gauthier, M. Hansotte, New York, April 22, 1918
An Old Song Re-Sung, 1918
Sorrow of Mydath, 1917
Three Poems of Fiona MacLeod, Op. 11, 1918; V. Janacopulos, Griffes, New York, March 22, 1919; orchestrated 1918, M. Dresser, Philadelphia Orch, cond. T. Rich, Wilmington, DE, March 24, 1919
The Lament of Ian the Proud
Thy Dark Eyes to Mine
The Rose of the Night
Si mes vers avaient des ailes (V. Hugo), 1901
Sur ma lyre l'autre fois (C.A. Sainte-Beuve), ?1901
German Songs, c1903–1909
Am Kreuzweg wird begraben (Heinrich Heine)
An den Wind (Nikolaus Lenau)
Auf ihrem Grab (Heine)
Auf dem Teich, dem Regungslosen (Lenau)
Auf geheimen Waldespfade (Lenau)
Das ist ein Brausen und Heulen (Heine)
Das sterbende Kind (Emanuel Geibel)
Der träumende See (Julius Mosen)
Des müden Abendlied (Geibel)
Elfe (J. von Eichendorff)
Entflieh mit mir (Heine)
Es fiel ein Reif (Heine)
Frühe (Eichendorff)
Gedicht von Heine (Mit schwarzen Segeln)
Ich weiss nicht, wie's geschieht (Geibel)
Könnt’ ich mit dir dort oben gehn (Mosen)
Meeres Stille (J. W. von Goethe)
Mein Herz ist wie die dunkle Nacht (Geibel)
Mir war, als müsst’ ich graben (Das Grab) (Christian Friedrich Hebbel)
Nacht liegt auf den fremden Wegen (Heine)
So halt’ ich endlich dich umfangen (Geibel)
Winternacht (Lenau)
Wo ich bin, mich rings umdunkelt (Heine), c1903–11
Wohl lag ich einst in Gram und Schmerz (Geibel)
Zwei Könige sassen auf Orkadal (Geibel), before 1910
The Water-Lily (J.B. Tabb), 1911
The Half-Ring Moon (Tabb), 1912
Nachtlied (Geibel), 1912
Pierrot (S. Teasdale), 1912
Les ballons (Wilde), ?1912, rev. 1915
Cleopatra to the Asp (Tabb)
Evening Song (S. Lanier)
The First Snowfall (Tabb)
Phantoms (Tabb), c1912
The War-Song of the Vikings (F. MacLeod), 1914
Two Birds flew into the Sunset Glow (Rom. trad.), 1914
Song of the Dagger (Rom. trad.), 1916
In the Harem (Chu Ch′ing-yü), ?1917
Hampelas, Kinanti, Djakoan (Javanese trad.), c1917

Choral works
Passionlied ("O Haupt voll Blut und Wunden") (P. Gerhardt), SSATB, 1906
Lobe den Herren (J. Neander), SSATB, 1906
Dies ist der Tag (I. Watts), SSATB, 1906
These things shall be (J.A. Symonds), unison chorus, 1916

References

Further reading
  The definitive biography of the composer and is widely available secondhand
 
 
 
 "Griffes, Charles Tomlinson", in The Biographical Dictionary of Musicians (1939), Garden City, New York: Doubleday.

External links

Edward Maisel research files on Charles T. Griffes, 1904–1985 Music Division, The New York Public Library.
Donna K. Anderson research files on Charles Tomlinson Griffes, 1800s-2017 Music Division, The New York Public Library.
Thomas Hampson: I Hear America Singing - Composer profile
Charles Griffes. American Musicological Society Newsletter Essay by Howard Pollack

1884 births
1920 deaths
20th-century American composers
20th-century American male musicians
20th-century classical composers
American classical composers
American male classical composers
Classical musicians from New York (state)
Deaths from the Spanish flu pandemic in New York (state)
LGBT classical composers
American LGBT musicians
LGBT people from New York (state)
People from Elmira, New York